Ernest Ailred Worms (1891-1963) was a German missionary who lived and worked among Indigenous Australians. He became an expert in Aboriginal languages, and an important contributor to the development of both Australian studies of native languages, and to the ethnography of the continent's Indigenous peoples.

Life 
He was ordained a Pallotine father, and spent his first period of missionary work in Broome, where he served as parish priest for eight years. His interest in ethnography led to particular studies among the Bardi people.

Stolen bones
In 1935 Worms came across the large body of an Aboriginal person wrapped for burial in bark and, as was a widespread custom, placed in the fork of a tree. He gathered the remains and dispatched them to Limburg. Worms was quite aware that he was violating the law against the unauthorised export of ethnological materials in doing so, and therefore requested anonymity. The remains, together with other skeletal material, was repatriated and restored to the Bardi Jawi, who laid them to rest in an offshore cave, in November 2015.

Works

Worms, Ernest A. (1968): Australische eingeborenen religionen.  Translated by M.J. Wilson, D. O'Donovan, M. Charlesworth as Australian Aboriginal religions, Spectrum Publications, for Nelen Yubu Missiological Unit, 1986.

Notes

Citations

Sources

1891 births
1963 deaths
Australian anthropologists
Australian lexicographers
20th-century anthropologists
Pallottines
20th-century lexicographers